Sisters Minor may refer to:

 Order of Saint Clare (Poor Clares)
 Sisters Minor of Mary Immaculate